This is an alphabetical list of psychotherapies.

This list contains some approaches that may not call themselves a psychotherapy but have a similar aim of improving mental health and well being through talk and other means of communication.

In the 20th century, a great number of psychotherapies were created.  All of these face continuous change in popularity, methods, and effectiveness. Sometimes they are self-administered, either individually, in pairs, small groups or larger groups. However, a professional practitioner will usually use a combination of therapies and approaches, often in a team treatment process that involves reading/talking/reporting to other professional practitioners.

The older established therapies usually have a code of ethics, professional associations, training programs, and so on. The newer and innovative therapies may not yet have established these structures or may not wish to.

This list is a mixture of psychotherapy articles that cover topics at various levels of abstraction, such as theoretical frameworks, specific therapy packages, and individual techniques.

A 
 Abreaction therapy
 Accelerated experiential dynamic psychotherapy (AEDP)
 Acceptance and commitment therapy (ACT)
 Adlerian therapy
 Adventure therapy
 Analytical psychology
 Animal-assisted therapy
 Art therapy
 Association splitting
 Attack therapy
 Attachment-based psychotherapy
 Attachment-based therapy (children)
 Attachment therapy
 Autogenic training
 Aversion therapy

B 
 Behavioral activation
 Behavior modification
 Behavior therapy
 Bibliotherapy
 Biodynamic psychotherapy
 Bioenergetic analysis
 Biofeedback
 Body psychotherapy
 Bonding psychotherapy
 Brief psychotherapy

C 
 Classical Adlerian psychotherapy
 Chess therapy
 Child psychotherapy
 Christian counseling
 Clean language
 Client-centered psychotherapy
 Co-counselling
 Cognitive analytic therapy
 Cognitive behavioral analysis system of psychotherapy
 Cognitive behavioral therapy (CBT)
 Cognitive behavioral therapy for insomnia (CBT-I)
 Cognitive therapy
 Coherence therapy
 Collaborative therapy
 Compassion focused therapy (CFT)
 Concentrative movement therapy
 Contemplative psychotherapy
 Contextual therapy
 Conversational model
 Conversion therapy (pseudoscientific)
 Counting method
 Couples therapy
 Creative music therapy
 Cultural family therapy

D 
 Dance therapy or dance movement therapy (DMT)
 Daseinsanalysis
 Decoupling for body-focused repetitive behaviors
 Depth psychology
 Developmental eclecticism
 Developmental needs meeting strategy (DNMS)
 Dialectical behavior therapy (DBT)
 Drama therapy
 Dreamwork
 Dyadic developmental psychotherapy (DDP)
 Dynamic deconstructive psychotherapy

E 
 Eastern Orthodox psychotherapy
 Eclectic psychotherapy
 Ecological counseling
 Ego-state therapy
 Emotionally focused therapy (EFT)
 Emotional Freedom Techniques, a pseudoscientific therapy
 Encounter groups
 Eye movement desensitization and reprocessing (EMDR)
 Existential therapy
 Exposure and response prevention
 Exposure therapy
 Expressive therapies

F 
 Family Constellations
 Family therapy
 Feminist therapy
 Focusing (psychotherapy)
 Forensic psychotherapy
 Freudian psychotherapy
 Functional analytic psychotherapy (FAP)
 Future-oriented therapy

G 
 Gay affirmative psychotherapy
 Gestalt therapy
 Gestalt theoretical psychotherapy
 Grief counseling
 Group analysis
 Group therapy
 Guided affective imagery

H 
 Habit reversal training
 Hagiotherapy
 Hakomi
 Heimler method of human social functioning
 Hip hop therapy
 Holotropic breathwork
 Holding therapy
 Humanistic psychology
 Human givens
 Hypnotherapy

I 
 Imago therapy
 Immersion therapy
 Inner Relationship Focusing
 Insight-oriented psychotherapy
 Institutional psychotherapy
 Integral psychotherapy
 Integrative body psychotherapy
 Integrative psychotherapy
 Intensive short-term dynamic psychotherapy
 Internal Family Systems Model
 Interpersonal psychoanalysis
 Interpersonal psychotherapy
 Interpersonal reconstructive therapy

J 
 Journal therapy
 Jungian psychotherapy

L 
 Logic-based therapy
 Logotherapy

M 
 Marriage counseling
 MDMA-assisted psychotherapy
 Milieu therapy
 Mindfulness-based cognitive therapy
 Mindfulness-based stress reduction
 Mentalization-based treatment
 Metacognitive therapy
 Metacognitive training
 Metaphor therapy
 Method of levels (MOL)
 Mode deactivation therapy (MDT)
 Morita therapy
 Motivational enhancement therapy
 Motivational interviewing
 Multimodal therapy
 Multiple impact therapy
 Multisystemic therapy
 Multitheoretical psychotherapy
 Music therapy

N 
 Narrative exposure therapy
 Narrative therapy
 Nonviolent Communication
 Nordoff–Robbins music therapy
 Nouthetic counseling
 Nude psychotherapy

O 
 Object relations psychotherapy
 Online counseling
 Orthodox psychotherapy

P 
 Parent–child interaction therapy
 Parent-infant psychotherapy
 Parent management training
 Pastoral counseling
 Person-centered therapy
 Play therapy
 Poetry therapy
 Positive psychology
 Positive psychotherapy
 Postural Integration
 Primal therapy
 Primal Integration
 Process oriented psychology
 Process psychology
 Progressive counting (PC)
 Prolonged exposure therapy
 Provocative therapy
 Psychedelic therapy
 Psychoanalysis
 Psychodrama
 Psychodynamic psychotherapy
 Psychosynthesis
 Psychotherapy and social action model
 Pulsing (bodywork)

R 
 Rapid resolution therapy
 Rational emotive behavior therapy (REBT)
 Rational living therapy (RLT)
 Reality therapy
 Rebirthing-breathwork
 Recovered-memory therapy
 Re-evaluation counseling
 Regulation-focused psychotherapy for children
 Reichian therapy
 Relationship counseling
 Relational-cultural therapy
 Reminiscence therapy
 Remote therapy
 Rogerian psychotherapy
 Rolfing

S 
 Sandplay therapy
 Satitherapy
 Schema therapy
 School-based family counseling
 Sensorimotor psychotherapy
 Sensory integration therapy
 Sex therapy
 Sexual identity therapy
 Sexual trauma therapy
 Social therapy
 Solution focused brief therapy
 Somatic experiencing
 Somatic psychology
 Spiritual self-schema therapy
 Status dynamic psychotherapy
 Strategic family therapy
 Structural family therapy
 Superhero therapy
 Supportive psychotherapy
 Systematic desensitization
 Systemic therapy

T 
 T-groups
 Therapeutic community
 Thought Field Therapy
 Transactional analysis
 Transference focused psychotherapy
 Transpersonal psychology
 Transtheoretical model (TTM or "stages of change")
 Trauma focused cognitive behavioral therapy
 Trauma-informed feminist therapy
 Trauma systems therapy
 Twelve-step programs

V 
 Vegetotherapy

W 
 Wilderness therapy
 Writing therapy

Y 
 Yoga for therapeutic purposes

See also
 Clinical behavior analysis
 List of cognitive–behavioral therapies
 List of counseling topics
 List of therapies

Psychotherapies